The Bavali River is an 84 km long river that flows from the Chekuthan thodu, Wayanad passes located in the South Indian state of Kerala which goes to Valapattanam River at Munambu Kadavu, Kannur. The famous Shiva temple Kottiyoor Temple is located in the middle of a small river known as Thiruvanchira on the north bank of the Bavali River. Kottiyoor Vaisakha Festival is held on the banks of Bavalipuzha. It is also known as Vavu Balippuzha (Vavali river).

Course 
The Bavali River starts from Chekuthan thode in Wayanad District in Kerala. Initially the river flows over 20 km in the Western Ghats region to reach Ambayathode. Then the river enters the eastern hilly regions of Kannur district at Kottiyoor village. Then the river passes through small towns- Chungakkunnu, Kelakam, Kanichar and Pala(Kannur)(where the Kanjirapuzha river joins). Then the river reaches at Ayyapankavu, where the Aralam river joins the Bavali river. Then it flows towards Iritty town where the Veni river joins the Bavali river. Then the Bavali river passes through Padiyoor, Perumannu, Irikkur, Pavannur and finally joins with the Valapattanam River at Munambu Kadavu, Koyyam.

Tributaries
 Kanjirapuzha river
 Aralam river
 Veni river

gallery

References

Rivers of Kannur district